The 18th World Athletics Indoor Championships were held from 18 to 20 March 2022 in Belgrade, Serbia.

Ethiopia headed the medal table, with 4 gold medals, despite winning only nine in total. United States, second on gold medals won with 3, won the most medals, 19.

Bidding process
Belgrade won the bid for the Championships on November 22, 2019.

Schedule

All dates are CET (GMT+1)

Entry standards

Medal summary

Men

Women

Medal table

Participating nations
In brackets the number of athletes participating.

 (1)
 (2)
 (1)
 (1)
 (1)
 (15)
 (2)
 (1)
 (5)
 (1)
 (3)
 (20)
 (1)
 (1)
 (1)
 (1)
 (17)
 (1)
 (2)
 (1)
 (18)
 (1)
 (1)
 (1)
 (1)
 (1)
 (1)
 (2)
 (5)
 (3)
 (13)
 (5)
 (1)
 (5)
 (1)
 (1)
 (5)
 (1)
 (14)
 (5)
 (10)
 (1)
 (16)
 (2)
 (1)
 (30)
 (6)
 (1)
 (4)
 (2)
 (1)
 (4)
 (2)
 (3)
 (1)
 (2)
 (16)
 (3)
 (22)
 (1)
 (15)
 (7)
 (3)
 (9)
 (1)
 (1)
 (1)
 (2)
 (1)
 (1)
 (2)
 (3)
 (1)
 (1)
 (1)
 (2)
 (1)
 (4)
 (1)
 (1)
 (1)
 (5)
 (20)
 (5)
 (1)
 (6)
 (1)
 (5)
 (1)
 (1)
 (1)
 (1)
 (1)
 (23)
 (12)
 (1)
 (2)
 (10)
 (1)
 (1)
 (13)
 (1)
 (1)
 (1)
 (7)
 (7)
 (3)
 (1)
 (1)
 (25)
 (1)
 (14)
 (10)
 (1)
 (1)
 (1)
 (4)
 (1)
 (1)
 (1)
 (2)
 (6)
 (1)
 (52)
 (1)
 (1)
 (2)
 (3)

 Belarusian and Russian athletes are not allowed to compete at the event after a ban as a result of the Russian invasion of Ukraine.

Concerns and critisms

Kosovo's participation 
Kosovo had one representative at the championships, Gresa Bakraqi who competed at women's 1500m event. Due a long-standing dispute over the country’s independence from the host nation, Kosovo's flag was not shown on the big screen and not been included on the official competition website ran by the Organising Committee and hosted on the World Athletics domain.

References

External links
World Athletics website

World Athletics Indoor Championships
World Athletics Indoor Championships
World Indoor Championships
International athletics competitions hosted by Serbia
21st century in Serbia
World Athletics Indoor Championships